Gideonsbergs IF is a sports club in Västerås, Sweden. Established in 1955, the women's soccer section was established in 1971. The women's soccer team won the Swedish national championship in 1992. and the Swedish Cup in 1993.

The women's bandy team has played 2 seasons in the Swedish top division,

References

External links
Official website 

1955 establishments in Sweden
Defunct bandy clubs in Sweden
Football clubs in Västmanland County
Sport in Västerås
Association football clubs established in 1955
Bandy clubs established in 1955